The Barungguan are an Aboriginal Australian people of the Cape York Peninsula of Northern Queensland. The name is associated with three languages: Ganganda, Umpithamu and Morrobolam.

Name
The anthropologist Donald Thomson classified them (speaking of them as the Yintjinga) as one of what he called the Kawadji peoples.

Country
Their furthest northern limit appears to have been around the Rocky River, beyond which they rarely ventured.

Social organisation
The Barungguan were organized into clans the names of at least two of which are known:
 Umbuigamu
 Umbindhamu

As with the neighbouring Walmbaria, tooth avulsion was practiced on all members of either sex among the Barungguan, with either the right or left upper incisor extracted for ritual purposes.

Alternative names
 Baka. (Kaantju exonym)
 Banjigam. (Bakanambia exonym)
 Barunguan. (typo)
 Ganganda
 Jintjingga. (native toponym for a site at the mouth of the Stewart River)
 Njindingga
 Umbindhamu
 Umbuigamu
 Yintjingga

Source:

Notes

Citations

Sources

Aboriginal peoples of Queensland
Far North Queensland